Nicholas Tristan Phillip Helm (born 1 October 1980) is an English comedian, actor and rock musician known for his comedic confrontational delivery. His routines have been described as "brash and bullish". Many of his performances begin with him acting calmly and see him gradually getting more and more enraged about what he is talking about. He came to prominence following the success of his 2010 Edinburgh Fringe show Keep Hold of the Gold. In 2014, Helm made his main acting debut as lead character Andy in the BBC Three sitcom Uncle.

Early life
Helm was born in  Barts Hospital in West Smithfield, London, and raised in Finsbury Park, until the age of 8 when he then moved to St Albans, Hertfordshire. He attended Cunningham Hill Primary School, after which he graduated to Sandringham Secondary School. Following this he attended the University of Winchester.

While at secondary school Helm began writing and performing. In 1997, when he was in the sixth form, his drama teacher Louise Howes brought the school's production of Romeo and Juliet to the Edinburgh Festival. Helm played the part of Prince Escalus.

Career
With friends, Helm began taking shows to the Edinburgh Fringe Festival in the early 2000s with increasing levels of success.

By 2007, Helm began performing solo stand-up, but also maintained his theatrical work with a 2008 Fringe show called I Think You Stink, which gained critical acclaim. Comedian Richard Herring called it a "lovely little hidden gem... funny, silly and slightly chilling... something very new and special".

Helm has worked closely with his friends on the stand-up circuit, performing mixed bill stand-up shows at the Fringe before his first fully solo show, Keep Hold of the Gold, in 2010.

In 2011, the follow up, Dare to Dream, saw him nominated for the Fosters best comedy show and a joke lifted from the show won Dave'''s award for the funniest joke of the 2011 Edinburgh Fringe: "I needed a password eight characters long so I picked Snow White and the Seven Dwarves".

In 2012 Helm appeared regularly on the BBC Three series Live at the Electric performing songs with backing band, The Helmettes. There were further TV appearances on 8 Out of 10 Cats (including as Santa in the 2012 Christmas Special) and its spin-off 8 Out of 10 Cats Does Countdown (on which he has a recurring bit where he repeatedly fails to woo the show's lexicographer, Susie Dent), The Boyle Variety Performance, Russell Howard's Good News and a new show for Edinburgh, This Means War.

His 2013 Edinburgh Fringe show, One Man Mega Myth, strongly referenced Evel Knievel, and he was again nominated for Best Show in the Edinburgh Comedy Awards, losing out to Bridget Christie.

Helm won the South Bank Sky Arts "The Times Breakthrough Award" on 27 January 2014.

Helm also plays guitar and sings. He has so far released three solo albums. His latest album is called Hot 'n' Heavy, released on 10 May 2013. He performed "He Makes You Look Fat", one of the tracks from his album, when he appeared as the stand-up guest on Russell Howard's Good News.

In 2014 Helm started playing the lead role of Andy in the BBC Three sitcom Uncle. The show was written by Oliver Refson, and featured songs written and performed by Helm and his band. The third and final series of Uncle was screened in January-February 2017.

Helm's comedy/music show Nick Helm's Heavy Entertainment broadcast on BBC Three in May-June 2015.

In 2015 Helm co-wrote and co-starred with Esther Smith in an episode of the BBC Three online series of short stories, Funny Valentines. The episode, titled "Elephant", was nominated for a Short Film BAFTA Award in 2016.

In mid-2017 Helm starred in the sitcom Loaded (Channel 4), about a group of IT entrepreneurs who become millionaires when their company is bought out, and in the food comedic documentary Eat Your Heart Out with Nick Helm'' (Dave). He also performed Work in Progress shows at the Edinburgh Festival Fringe.

In 2020, during the COVID-19 pandemic lockdown, he starred in the online comedy series Angry Quiz Guy.

In August 2021, he starred as a guest on the Cheapshow podcast with fellow comedian Nathaniel Metcalfe.

Filmography

Television
As actor

As himself

Video games

References

External links

 
 
 
 
 Biog at agent's website
 2012 filmed interview with Helm about his Edinburgh Fringe shows

Living people
1980 births
21st-century English male actors
Comedians from Hertfordshire
Comedians from London
English male stage actors
English male television actors
English stand-up comedians
Male actors from Hertfordshire
Male actors from London
People from St Albans
British male comedy actors